Independence Palace is a palace in Minsk. The palace is located on Pieramožcaŭ Avenue, near the "BelExpo" exhibition centre and the State Flag Square, not far from Victory Park.

The purpose of the Palace of Independence is to host important and landmark events, meetings of foreign delegations, honouring of big families, and the admittance of children to pioneer organisations.

On 7 May 2013 Alexander Lukashenko said:

Structure and layout
The Palace of Independence is oriented.

History
The first official events in the palace were the meeting of the Supreme Eurasian Economic Council at the level of heads of state, and the meeting of the Council of CIS heads of state.

On 25 February 2014, Alexander Lukashenko awarded three-time champion of the 2014 Winter Olympics Darya Domracheva the Hero of Belarus medal.

The meeting on the Russo-Ukrainian War between the presidents of Russia, Ukraine, Belarus, Kazakhstan and representatives of the European Union was held at the Palace of Independence in Minsk on 26 August 2014.

The palace was a focal point for anti-government protesters during the 2020-2021 Belarusian protests.

References
Notes

Buildings and structures in Minsk
Government buildings completed in 2013
Presidential residences